Astro AWANI is a Malaysian news organisation that broadcasts its news via Channel 501 on Astro. Since 2018, Astro AWANI has been consecutively recognised as Malaysia's most trusted news source by the Reuter's Digital News Report published by Reuters Institute for the Study of Journalism. Launched on 6 September 2007, AWANI has since become a household news brand among Malaysians as the go to channel for breaking news. It broadcasts an array of programmes including bulletins, business & current affairs shows, special interviews, investigative reports, variety programmes, as well as selected magazine shows. 

Its signature programmes include AWANI 7:45 (Prime Time News), Agenda AWANI (Current Affairs Programme), Buletin AWANI (Hourly bulletins throughout the day), AWANI Pagi (Morning variety show), Niaga AWANI (Business & Finance), Consider This (English Current Affairs), Notepad with Ibrahim Sani (Finance, Markets & Tech) and Dialog Tiga Penjuru (Current affairs show in a forum/debate format). 

Astro AWANI's live channel is accessible regardless of location via its website (www.astroawani.com), designated Astro AWANI App, and Youtube Live. It has significant presence on Twitter, Instagram, Youtube, Facebook, TikTok, Linked In and Telegram.

History 

In 2002, the channel was launched as The News Channel (Astro News). During that time, it carried programming from Al Jazeera (broadcast in Arabic with live Malaysian dubbing), BBC World, CCTV-9, Eurosport News, the Australia Network and Deutsche Welle. It also aired Astro News, a half-hour locally produced news program.

The five networks carried on that channel were since available separately. Until February 2007, Astro News was co-produced with the national news agency Bernama. The news is also translated into Mandarin Chinese on Astro AEC, Malaysian on Astro Ria and Tamil on Astro Vaanavil. English news was also aired on Astro Prima.

Astro Awani was first launched on 15 June 2006 in Indonesia by a joint venture between Astro and India-based NDTV. However, due to continued differences between the JV partners, the Indonesian version went off-air in October 2008.

On 6 September 2007, Astro Awani was launched in Malaysia, at the Palace of the Golden Horses.

In 2008, Astro AWANI was renumbered from channel 123 to channel 501. 

In 2018, Astro AWANI was recognised as the “most trusted” Malaysian news brand in The Reuters Institute Digital News Report . and has since consecutively gained this recognition throughout years 2019, 2020 and 2021.

Milestones 

 Extensive coverage of the MH370 tragedy in 2014 as the go to channel, as well as the go to source by international news agencies. 
 Historic coverage of the 14th Malaysian General Election where it was recognised for its impartial and bold presentation on national TV and online.

Regular presenters

Notable personalities 

 Ashwad Ismail - Head/Editor-in-Chief of Astro Awani HD as of 2021. 
 Nazri Kahar 
 Marlina Manaf
 Cynthia Ng 
 Asyraf Hasnan 
 Ibrahim Sani
 Jasmine Abu Bakar
 Hafiz Marzukhi 
 Hakim Rahman
 Hilal Azmi
 Nailah Huda
 Geegee Ahmad
 Hafizi Rosli
 Melisa Idris
 Hilmi Malik 
 Luqman Hariz
 Najib Aroff
 Dzulfitri Yusop 
 Fauzi Zin
 Faris Danial
 Firdaus Azil 
 Afiezy Azaman
 Ian Johan Ariff (Bual Bola)
 Israr Khalid (Bual Bola)
 Essan Yahya
 Nursyazwani Saiful Sham
 Sharaad Kuttan (Consider This)
 Syaff Shukri 
 Assim Hassan
 Nickyson Nyambar (AWANI Borneo)
 Raja Hisyam Raja Zaid
 Shafizan Johari

Source:

See also 
 Astro (television)

References 

24-hour television news channels in Malaysia
Television channels and stations established in 2007
Astro Malaysia Holdings television channels
Malaysian news websites